Motoshige (written: 職鎮) is a masculine Japanese given name. Notable people with the name include:

, Japanese samurai
Nabeshima Motoshige (1602–1654), Japanese daimyō

Japanese masculine given names